Elbert McKinley "Sonny" Forriest (May 21, 1934 – January 10, 1999) was an American guitar player. He is best known for playing guitar for The Coasters.

Biography
Forriest was born in Pendleton, North Carolina in 1934. During the Korean War, Forriest served in the United States Air Force. From 1959 through 1961, he played guitar with The Coasters on such recordings as "Besame Mucho," "Wake Me, Shake Me," "Shoppin' For Clothes," "Thumbin' A Ride," "Girls Girls Girls," "Ridin' Hood," and "Lady Like." He joined the Ray Charles Orchestra in 1962
. Forriest recorded four songs for Verve Records. 

On September 30, 1963, he recorded "In Trouble" (unreleased) and "Now That I'm Lonely."  On October 1, 1963, he recorded "I'm Travelin'" and "Wedding Day" (unreleased). He released a solo jazz album called "Tuff Pickin': The Blue Guitar Of Sonny Forriest And His Orchestra" on Decca Records in 1965. He has also done studio work for other artists including Ray Charles and Hank Crawford. He died on January 10, 1999, in Capitol Heights, Maryland.

His son Sonny Forriest Jr. is a musician who has lived in New York City and Philadelphia; Sonny Forriest Jr. has played with groups including Harold Melvin & The Blue Notes, The Philly Intruders, and The Hearts Of Stone.

Discography

Solo singles
 Madame Booty Grenn / Mama Keep My Wife at Home: Recorded in November 1959, Red Top Records (128)
 Diddy Bop / Knockdown: Recorded in November 1959, Atco Records (6157) (as "Sonny Forrest")
 Sonny's Groove / Madame Booty Green: Recorded in November 1959, Atco Records (6157) - Unissued
 In Trouble: Recorded in September 1963, Verve Records - Unissued
 Now that I'm Lonely / I'm Traveling: Recorded in Sept./Oct. 1963, Verve Records
 Wedding Day: Recorded in October 1963, Verve Records - Unissued
 Don't Mess With My Woman / Train: Recorded in May 1964 (possibly), Escort Records (106)
 Lil' Sister / It's Very Clear: Recorded in May 1964 (possibly), Escort Records - Unissued
 I Got A Woman/Tuff Pickin' (Decca #31888) (1965)

Solo albums
 Tuff Pickin': The Blue Guitar Of Sonny Forriest & His Orchestra (Decca #DL-4716) (1965)
 Mashin' It : Recorded in April 1965, Decca Records (LP 4716)
 Miss Dee McC Recorded in April 1965, Decca Records (LP 4716)
 Minor Blast: Recorded in April 1965, Decca Records (LP 4716)
 Tuff Pickin': Recorded in May 1965, Decca Records (LP 4716)
 My Soul is Happy: Recorded in May 1965, Decca Records (LP 4716)
 Goodbye Charlie: Recorded in May 1965, Decca Records (LP 4716)
 Unchain my Heart: Recorded in May 1965, Decca Records (LP 4716)
 Bitter with the Sweet: Recorded in May 1965, Decca Records (LP 4716)
 Stepping: Recorded in May 1965, Decca Records (LP 4716)
 What's this Thing Called Love: Recorded in May 1965, Decca Records (LP 4716)
 I Got a Woman: Recorded in May 1965, Decca Records (LP 4716)

As sideman
With The Coasters
One By One (Atco, 1960)
With Hank Crawford
From the Heart (Atlantic Records, 1962)
True Blue (Atlantic, 1964)
After Hours (Atlantic, 1966)
Mr. Blues (Atlantic, 1967)

References

Bibliography
Blues Records, Mike Leadbitter & Neil Slaven, Record Information Services, 1987 -

External links
 The Coasters Web Site
 
  Verve Records Discography

1934 births
1999 deaths
20th-century American guitarists
American male guitarists
American rhythm and blues guitarists
United States Air Force airmen
United States Air Force personnel of the Korean War
20th-century American male musicians